Gobet is a surname. Notable people with the surname include:

Fernand Gobet (born 1962), Swiss cognitive scientist and psychologist
Louis Gobet (1908–?), Swiss footballer
Richard Gobet (fl.1382–1390), English politician

French-language surnames